My Name Is Gulpilil is a 2021 documentary film about the life of celebrated Australian actor David Gulpilil, at the time sick with stage four lung cancer.

Synopsis
The film covers Gulpilil's acting career, his life in Murray Bridge, the cancer, alcohol addiction, and his various marriages and relationships.

Production
My Name is Gulpilil was directed by Australian filmmaker Molly Reynolds.

It was mostly shot in 2017, with the expectation that Gulpilil (who died in November 2021) would not live much longer. The use of Gulpilil's name in the title, potentially problematic in Aboriginal culture after his death, was a deliberate choice by the actor.

Reception

Critical response 
On Rotten Tomatoes, the documentary holds an approval rating of 100% based on 10 reviews, with an average rating of 8/10.

Awards 
 Australian Academy of Cinema and Television Arts Award (AACTA): Winner, Best Documentary (Molly Reynolds, Rolf de Heer, Peter Djigirr, David Gulpilil); Best Editing in a documentary (Tania Nehme)
 Australian Screen Editors Award: Nominated for Best Editing in a Documentary Feature (Tania Nehme)
 Atom Awards: Finalist in three categories (Best Documentary – Arts; Best Documentary – Biography; Best Documentary – History); winner in the Biography and History categories

References 

Australian documentary films
Documentary films about Aboriginal Australians
2021 documentary films
2021 films
2020s Australian films